Fugitive 9 is a hip-hop collective formed in 2001 in Norfolk, Virginia. Members currently include Think Sphinxes, Whyze Oner, Moe Hendrix, Cuda Brown, Delta Automatik, Sintax Zero, and Dyslexia. They have collaborated with several well known artists, such as Chad Hugo of The Neptunes, Killah Priest of the Wu-Tang Clan, and Canibus. 

http://Soundcloud.com/catpryme

              999
          Da Wormhole

Discography 
 Critical Massive Volume 1 (2013)
 Immobilize (2013)
 Carbon Harbingers (2013)
 Steel Helix Tape (2014)
 Vision Alpha (2016)

References 

Musical groups from Virginia